Marthoma Senior Secondary School is a school in Kozhencherry, Pathanamthitta District, India, affiliated to the CBSE. The school was established in 1982 by Malankara Marthoma Syrian Church. The vicar of the nearby St.Thomas church is its manager. The school is run by a governing board appointed by the society.

The school has six sections: 
 Play school
 Kindergarten (LKG, UKG)
 Lower Primary (1st to 4th)
 Upper Primary (5th to 7th standard)
 High School (8th to 10th standard)
 Senior Secondary (11th and 12th)

The school had a change of principal in 2011. The school has more than 2000 students enrolled and around 140 staff members and has a library.

As a CBSE school, cell phones are prohibited for the students on the campus along with a ban on all electronics such as laptops and iPods.

The school has a payphone for the use of students, and more than ten school buses covering a radius of 500 km from the school. Conveyance in the school's buses is expensive, with the minimum term-fee being 500.

Uniform
The uniform of the school is a light blue shirt and a dark navy blue pants. During 2010, the school remodeled their uniform. From classes 1st to 10th it is a light blue shirt with navy blue pants and vest for girls. For boys it is a light blue shirt and navy blue pants. The higher secondary students uniforms comprise a cream churidar top with dark brown pants and vests for girls, and light brown shirts with dark brown pants for boys.

The school is managed by St. Thomas Marthoma Church, Kozhencherry. The church manages two other schools St. Thomas Higher Secondary School, Kozhencherry and St. Mary's Girls High School, Kozhencherry.

Notable alumni
 George Thengummoottil, Filmmaker

References

Christian schools in Kerala
Primary schools in Kerala
High schools and secondary schools in Kerala
Schools in Pathanamthitta district
Educational institutions established in 1982
1982 establishments in Kerala